Alexander George Foreman (1 March 1914 – 19 June 1969) was an English professional football player who played for Walthamstow Avenue, West Ham United, Tottenham Hotspur and represented the England amateur national football team on one occasion.

Playing career
Foreman played for amateur side Walthamstow Avenue before joining West Ham United in March, 1938.

The centre forward featured in six matches and scored one goal for the 'Hammers'. After the outbreak of the Second World War he played many war times matches for West Ham, and turned out several times for Tottenham Hotspur.

He signed for the White Hart Lane club in March, 1946 and went on to appear in 36 matches and netting 14 goals.  In the old Second Division Foreman scored on his debut in a 2–1 defeat versus Birmingham City at White Hart Lane in August 1946.

References

1914 births
1969 deaths
People from Walthamstow
English footballers
English Football League players
Walthamstow Avenue F.C. players
West Ham United F.C. players
Tottenham Hotspur F.C. players
Footballers from Walthamstow
Association football forwards